Sicoderus is a genus of true weevils in the beetle family Curculionidae. There are more than 75 described species in Sicoderus.

Species 
These species belong to the genus Sicoderus:

 Sicoderus abbreviatus Vanin, 1986
 Sicoderus aeneus Anderson, 2018
 Sicoderus alternatus Anderson, 2018
 Sicoderus analis Vanin, 1986
 Sicoderus angustatus Vanin, 1986
 Sicoderus antilope Vanin, 1986
 Sicoderus apicalis Vanin, 1986
 Sicoderus appendiculatus Vanin, 1986
 Sicoderus bautistai Anderson, 2018
 Sicoderus beatyi Anderson, 2018
 Sicoderus bicolor Vanin, 1986
 Sicoderus bipunctiventris Anderson, 2018
 Sicoderus bolivianus Vanin, 1986
 Sicoderus bondari Vanin, 1986
 Sicoderus brevirostris Vanin, 1986
 Sicoderus caladeler Anderson, 2018
 Sicoderus castaneus Vanin, 1986
 Sicoderus championi Vanin, 1986
 Sicoderus ciconia Vanin, 1986
 Sicoderus contiguus Vanin, 1986
 Sicoderus convexipennis Vanin, 1986
 Sicoderus coroni Vanin, 1986
 Sicoderus cracens Vanin, 1986
 Sicoderus delauneyi Vanin, 1986
 Sicoderus delusor Vanin, 1986
 Sicoderus detonnancouri Anderson, 2018
 Sicoderus disjunctus Vanin, 1986
 Sicoderus distinguendus Vanin, 1986
 Sicoderus exilis Vanin, 1986
 Sicoderus franzi Anderson, 2018
 Sicoderus globulicollis Vanin, 1986
 Sicoderus gracilis Vanin, 1986
 Sicoderus granatensis Vanin, 1986
 Sicoderus guanyangi Anderson, 2018
 Sicoderus guyanensis Vanin, 1986
 Sicoderus hamburgi Vanin, 1986
 Sicoderus hirsutiventris Anderson, 1999
 Sicoderus hirsutus Vanin, 1986
 Sicoderus humeralis Anderson, 2018
 Sicoderus ibis Vanin, 1986
 Sicoderus inermis Vanin, 1986
 Sicoderus insidiosus Vanin, 1986
 Sicoderus ivieorum Anderson, 1999
 Sicoderus labidus Vanin, 1986
 Sicoderus laevigatus Vanin, 1986
 Sicoderus lamellatus Vanin, 1986
 Sicoderus latifrons Vanin, 1986
 Sicoderus longirostris Vanin, 1986
 Sicoderus lucidus Anderson, 2018
 Sicoderus marshalli Vanin, 1986
 Sicoderus matuete Vanin, 1986
 Sicoderus medranae Anderson, 2018
 Sicoderus mollicomus Vanin, 1986
 Sicoderus morio Vanin, 1986
 Sicoderus nodieri Vanin, 1986
 Sicoderus parallelus Vanin, 1986
 Sicoderus perezi Anderson, 2018
 Sicoderus perpolitus Vanin, 1986
 Sicoderus petilus Vanin, 1986
 Sicoderus prolatus Vanin, 1986
 Sicoderus propinquus Vanin, 1986
 Sicoderus pseudostriatolateralis Anderson, 2018
 Sicoderus ramosi Vanin, 1986
 Sicoderus remotus Vanin, 1986
 Sicoderus robini Vanin, 2013
 Sicoderus schoenherri Vanin, 1986
 Sicoderus sleeperi Vanin, 1986
 Sicoderus striatolateralis Anderson, 2018
 Sicoderus subcoronatus Vanin, 1986
 Sicoderus thomasi Anderson, 2018
 Sicoderus tinamus (LeConte, 1884)
 Sicoderus tringa Vanin, 1986
 Sicoderus truncatipennis Vanin, 1986
 Sicoderus tumidipectus Vanin, 1986
 Sicoderus turnbowi Anderson, 2018
 Sicoderus vanini Anderson, 1999
 Sicoderus ventricosus Vanin, 1986
 Sicoderus woodruffi Anderson, 2018

References

Further reading

External links

 

Curculioninae
Articles created by Qbugbot